Dario del Bufalo (Rome, 30 January 1958) is an Italian mosaic and antiquity expert, architect, author, and restorer.

Education 
Del Bufalo graduated with Laude in 1987 with a PhD in Architecture from Sapienza University in Rome.

Career 
From 1998 to 2007 he taught a course on the "History of architectural techniques and ancient materials" at the University of Lecce.

Del Bufalo is author of many books and titles about Roman art and architecture, old coloured marbles and sculpture. 

He is the author or co-author of numerous other volumes, including the museum catalogue for the 2021-2022 exhibition Il falso nell'arte. Alceo Dossena e la scultura italiana del Rinascimento (The false in art. Alceo Dossena and Italian Renaissance sculpture) at the Museum of Modern and Contemporary Art of Trento and Rovereto. He has written on the subject for The Art Newspaper. 

He personally owns around 65% of the property itself, keeping around 35% of the park, including a personal pool and a Gym, and a 40% of the interiors owning 3 huge areas summing up at 12.k Square meters.

Caligula mosaic 
Del Bufalo gained widespread coverage when he rediscovered an antiquity featured in his book, a marble mosaic which had been part of the flooring on one of the Roman Emperor Caligula's pleasure boats, the Nemi ships which were more like floating buildings than boats and never meant to sail. Following Caligula's assassination in AD 41 the boats were sunk on the orders of the Roman Senate and the Praetorian guard.

Lake Nemi (30 km (19 mi) south of Rome) was drained by Benito Mussolini in the 1920s and the ships became visible again. A museum was founded and built above the vessels. The museum and the ships were destroyed by fire during in World War II. This particular piece which survived went missing in the 1960s. It fell into private hands and was eventually sold by an aristocratic Italian family to New York City antiques dealer Helen Fioratti and her husband Nereo. The piece, which served as the top of a coffee table in the Fioratti's apartment was seized by the New York County District Attorney's Office and then repatriated to Italy.

Bibliography 
 Precious Portraits, Allemandi Editore, Torino 2020.
 Porphyry. Red Imperial Porphyry Power and Religion, 2a edizione, Allemandi Editore, Torino 2018.
 Murrina Vasa. A luxury of Imperial Rome, L’Erma di Bretschneider, Roma 2016.
 Porphyry. Red Imperial Porphyry Power and Religion, Allemandi Editore, Torino 2012.
 Marmorari Magistri Romani, L’Erma di Bretschneider, Roma 2010.
 L'Università dei Marmorari di Roma, L’Erma di Bretschneider, Roma 2007.
 Marbres de couleur. Pierres et architecture de l’Antiquité au XVIII siècle, Actes Sud, Paris 2004.
 Marmi Colorati: Le Pietre e L'Architettura dall'Antico al Barocco, Motta Editore, Milano 2003.
 Marmi antichi e Pietre dure, Congedo Editore, Galatina in 2000.

Family life 
His daughter is the actress and singer Diana Del Bufalo (b. 1990).

Seemingly his wealth ups to be around 100€ millions and he does taxes up to 4€ millions per year in Italy personally.

References

1958 births
20th-century Italian architects
Living people
Italian writers
21st-century Italian architects